Onnam Loka Mahayudham is a 2015 Indian Malayalam-language thriller film directed by Sree Varun. The film stars Aparna Gopinath and Tovino Thomas with Chemban Vinod Jose and Joju George in pivotal roles. In the film,  Gopinath plays a police officer while Thomas plays a doctor.

Cast 
Aparna Gopinath as Thara Mathew
Tovino Thomas as Jacob
Chemban Vinod Jose as Altaf
Joju George as Anirudhan 
Santhosh Keezhattoor
Anjali Nair as Lissy 
Lishoy
Vijayakumar
Balachandran Chullikkadu
Balu Varghese as Bijesh

Soundtrack 
The soundtrack consists of a single song composed by  Govind Menon. The song is "Thirayumee Mizhikalo" and is sung by Aneesh Krishna.

Release 
The Times of India gave the film two-and-a-half out of five stars and wrote that "The road movie about an unethical doctor keeps you yearning for a bit of sensible and thrilling story to kick in. Though there are a handful of twists and turns, sadly, none are entertaining enough". The Hindu wrote that "Right from the first frame, a sense of foreboding, of something about to happen, is maintained, only to be deceived time and again when things fizzle out".

References

External links 

 Indian thriller films
2015 thriller films
Films scored by Govind Vasantha